The Compensation scheme for radiation-linked diseases is a workers compensation scheme administered by the UK government. It was established in November 1982 by British Nuclear Fuels Limited and its trade unions following legal actions brought against the company by nuclear industry workers in the late 1970s. At the time of its establishment, BNFL and its trade unions agreed that the causation of cancer by radiation was sufficiently well understood that "it should be possible to construct a scheme which would evaluate the probability that a diagnosed cancer may have been caused by radiation exposure at work." Initially the scheme only accepted claims in which a worker had died from a radiation-linked disease. In 1987 this was expanded to allow morbidity claims. The list of participating member employers and trade unions has grown through the 1990s and 2000s. As of July 2021, 1710 cases had been received and considerered since the Scheme began. 163 of those resulted in successful claims. Compensation payments exceeding £8.90 million have been paid to claimants.

Eligibility 
In order to be eligible for compensation, a worker must have been employed by a listed company, and have received an occupational radiation dose. Then the claimant must have developed cancer of the bladder, bone, brain and central nervous system, breast or uterus (for female workers), colon, liver, oesophagus, respiratory or lung, prostate, ovary, skin (non-Melanoma), thyroid or other tissues. Other compensable diseases include cataracts and leukaemias (with two exceptions). Some diseases are excluded on the basis that there is no convincing epidemiological evidence to link them with ionising radiation exposure. Excluded diseases include: Hodgkin's disease, hairy cell leukaemia, chronic lymphatic leukaemia (CLL), malignant melanoma and mesothelioma.

Eligible employers

Member Trade Unions 
In 1982, trade union members of the scheme included Transport and General Workers Union, Institution of Professional Civil Servants, Amalgamated Engineering Union, GMB and PCS. Other trades unions joined as the scheme expanded. Later members include the EETPU and MSF, UCATT, Engineers and Managers Association, Unison, the First Division Association of Civil Servants, the AEA Constabulary Federation (now the Civil Nuclear Police Federation) and the Defence Police Federation.

Claiming compensation 
Claims may be lodged by the worker, his or her wife, husband or partner (including same sex), the worker's "first line children" (those born to or legally adopted by the claimant). Once diagnosed with or deceased from an eligible disease, the worker or surviving family members have 30 years in which to make a claim. Claims can be made online, by post, by phone or through the worker's trade union. Once made, claims are assessed on consideration of medical, employment and dosimetry histories and data. These are used to calculate the probability that the cancer could have been caused by occupational exposure to radiation.

Payments 
The payment received following a successful claim varies depending on the actual loss (in earnings and pension) suffered by the claimant and sums for pain and suffering, loss of amenity and number of dependents. The level of payment awarded to a claimant (or estate if deceased) is determined by the "causation probability". The greater the causation probability, the greater the payment. Top tier payments are awarded if the causation probability is 50% or more. The Scheme publishes an Annual statement which is approved by the Scheme Council. The report includes a paragraph updating the number of claims and payments awarded.

By 22 February 2005, 1000 claims had been made, of which 97 had been awarded to varying degrees along a sliding scale.

As of December 2015, 1525 cases had been considered since the compensation scheme for radiation-linked diseases was established. 156 of these claims were successful, and payments totaling £8.24 million had been dispatched.

As of July 2021, 1710 cases had been received and considered since the Scheme began. 163 of those resulted in successful claims. Compensation payments exceeding £8.90 million have been paid to claimants.

References 

Occupational safety and health
Nuclear industry